Club Deportivo Mar y Plata are a Salvadoran professional football club based in Puerto El Triunfo, Usulután, El Salvador. They currently play in the Tercera Division de Fútbol Salvadoreño. The club was founded in 1962.

Honours

Domestic honours
 Segunda División Salvadorean and predecessors 
 Champions (1) : TBD
 Tercera División Salvadorean and predecessors 
 Champions:(1) : TBD

Current squad
As of 2018:

List of coaches
  Miguel Aguilar Obando (1991)
  Eduardo Hernánde (2002)
  Ángel Orellana (2003)
  Rubén Alonso (2003)
  José Antonio Andino (2004)
 Rigoberto Urias (2018–)

References

External links
  – El Salvador FC 
 

Football clubs in El Salvador
Association football clubs established in 1962
1962 establishments in El Salvador